Backusella tarrabulga is a species of zygote fungus in the order Mucorales. It was described by Andrew S. Urquhart and James K. Douch in 2020. The specific epithet refers to the type locality; Tarra-Bulga National Park, Australia.

See also
 
 Fungi of Australia

References

External links
 

Mucoraceae
Fungi described in 2020